Lophodelta is a genus of moths of the family Erebidae. The genus was erected by George Hampson in 1924.

Species
Lophodelta argyrolepia Hampson, 1924 Peru
Lophodelta dinemata Hampson, 1924 Trinidad
Lophodelta goniograpta Hampson, 1924 Guatemala
Lophodelta minima Hampson, 1924 Panama
Lophodelta peratostriga Hampson, 1924 Brazil (Rio de Janeiro)

References

Herminiinae